Michael Paul Ring (born 13 February 1961) is an English former footballer who played in the Football League for Brighton & Hove Albion, Hull City, Bolton Wanderers and Aldershot.

References

External links
 

1961 births
Living people
Footballers from Brighton
English footballers
English Football League players
Brighton & Hove Albion F.C. players
Greenock Morton F.C. players
Ballymena United F.C. players
Hull City A.F.C. players
Bolton Wanderers F.C. players
Aldershot F.C. players
Lewes F.C. players
Association football wingers
Scottish Football League players